Robin Wilson (born September 26, 1969) is an American entrepreneur, author, interior designer, and thought leader on Clean Design, as a wellness and sustainability advocate. Inc magazine selected Robin Wilson for the Female Founders 100 (October 2020), its 3rd annual global list of leading women entrepreneurs. She is the founder of a lifestyle brand that relaunched as CLEAN DESIGN HOME at Macy's  in 2021, and is based in New York City. As the creative director of the licensing division, she has partnered with retailers and generated over $85 million in branded wholesale revenue from textiles, furniture and cabinetry since 2010.

Wilson’s design work emphasizes the Clean Design protocol discussed in her second book, 'Clean Design: Wellness for Your Lifestyle'  (Greenleaf, 2015). Her first book was 'Kennedy Green House: Designing an Eco-Friendly Home from the Foundation to the Furniture'  (Greenleaf, 2010), with the foreword written by Robert F. Kennedy, Jr.

She has partnered with Joe Torre " to help domestic violence survivors. Her firm created Project Lilac which provides lilac sheet sets to safe houses identified by the Safe at Home Foundation led by Joe Torre. In 2023, this Project Lilac initiative won a Silver Anthem Award in the category Humanitarian Action & Services-Corporate Social Responsibility-Community Engagement (For Profit).  

She has built a brand that guides consumers 'from the foundation to the furniture' and has allowed her to partner with leading brands to reach consumers by integrating eco-friendly design, hypoallergenic products and sustainability. Clients in design and spokesperson projects have included Panasonic USA, the White House Fellows office, and the Lake Nona Laureate Park development. In addition, she has worked on showhouses, and for both residential, developer and commercial clients. She is an unpaid ambassador to the Asthma and Allergy Foundation of America and she has served the community through leadership on the Board of Directors for the Sustainable Furnishings Council (2012-2015); Do Something Board of Directors  (2003-2005); Boston Symphony Orchestra Board of Overseers (1995-2004); and YWCA Board of Directors in New York/Austin/Boston (1988-1999).

Early life and career 
Robin Wilson's parents were middle-class workers. Her father drove for Kerrville Bus Company (acquired by Coach USA) on long-distance routes. Her mother worked for state government in multiple agencies. Her family focused on education. Robin was diagnosed as pan-allergic at a young age, and was sickly. Her parents found a holistic pediatrician who focused on 'raising strong children, not children on strong medicine' and he guided her parents to organic food cooperatives in Austin (Wheatsville, Whole Foods) and was an advocate of exercise, healthy diet and indoor air quality management. As her health improved, she took notes and ultimately developed her ethos based on these practices.

Wilson was born in Austin, Texas, and attended public schools in Austin. After graduating from S. F. Austin High School, she entered the University of Texas at Austin in 1987 and obtained a Bachelor of Arts degree. While in college, she worked at the Lower Colorado River Authority and became immersed in environmental issues from energy efficiency to water conservation. She joined Mercer Management Consulting in Boston. In 1997, she moved to New York City while working for Heidrick & Struggles, a company that went public in 1999 which gave her a windfall to matriculate with a master's degree at New York University, with a degree in Real Estate Finance.

She was deeply affected by the death of her only sibling, her brother, a US Army soldier who died in 1993 in a motorcycle accident and to manage her grief, she created a bucket list, which has resulted in many adventures.

Career achievements 
She founded her firm in 2000 and rebranded it to the eponymous Robin Wilson Home in 2006. As an early advocate for clean construction method, she insists that work teams use low-VOC paints in both residential and commercial spaces to limit the wheezes and sneezes.

Wilson has done work for President Clinton's Harlem office, the Good Housekeeping Showhouse, the private residence of Robert F. Kennedy, Jr., White House Fellows organization, and in 2014, she completed the EcoBungalow-LA  project to rebuild a home for a family who lost everything in a fire.

Wilson was the first woman to license her name to eco-friendly kitchen cabinetry through Holiday Kitchens (licensed from 2008-2017), made in the USA in Rice Lake, Wisconsin, and sold at over 400 independent dealers nationwide.

She is considered an expert  on Clean Design, healthy homes and asthma/allergy friendly information. In June 2011, the Asthma and Allergy Foundation of America announced that she would serve as an ambassador.

Her furniture line, Nest Home by Robin Wilson, premiered at the International Contemporary Furniture Fair (ICFF) in May 2013 in New York City.

In 2020, she rebranded her product line to CLEAN DESIGN HOME which is trademarked and is sold online and at stores including Macy's, BELK, and sold globally to all branches of the military through their online commissary system. Products sold include bed textiles, bath towels, candles, cleaners and other categories.

Wilson is a paid speaker on the topics of entrepreneurship, brand building and Clean Design and is represented by All American Speakers. Plus, she is a blogger on the Huffington Post, where she has written about eco-healthy issues.

She had a well-read byline in the Washington Post regarding healthy living in an article about wellness living with allergies.

Robin Wilson has been recognized by the Library of Congress/History Makers project and her oral history has been catalogued.

References

External links 
  Robin Wilson Home

Living people
1969 births
Artists from Austin, Texas
University of Texas at Austin alumni
New York University alumni
African-American people
American interior designers
American non-fiction writers
HuffPost writers and columnists
American women interior designers
American women columnists
21st-century American women